The Armant (also known as the Egyptian Sheepdog or Ermenti) is a breed of herding dog from Egypt. It is believed the Armant descends from Briards brought to Egypt by Napoleon's armies, these dogs were likely crossed with local dogs to produce the first examples of the breed. The Armant is named after the town of Armant in Egypt, the supposed place of origin of the breed, the breed is not very well known but is used extensively within Egypt as both a herding dog and a guard dog.

Appearance
The Armant is a medium-sized dog, typically weighing between 50 and 65 pounds and standing at around 21 to 23 inches tall. It has a black and light-brown colored coat, and erect ears. It shares some physical qualities to the Newfoundland and the Bearded Collie.

Notes

See also
 Dogs portal
 List of dog breeds

References 

Herding dogs
Dog breeds originating in Africa